Alle tiders kupp is a 1964 Norwegian comedy film directed by Øyvind Vennerød, starring Rolf Just Nilsen, Arne Bang-Hansen, Henki Kolstad and Inger Marie Andersen. Three men rob an outlet of the government owned alcoholic beverage retailer Vinmonopolet. They then run into problems getting rid of the 50,000 bottles of liquor they have stolen.

External links
 
 Alle tiders kupp at Filmweb.no (Norwegian)

1964 films
1964 comedy films
Norwegian comedy films
Films directed by Øyvind Vennerød